The European Journal of Neuroscience is a biweekly peer-reviewed scientific journal covering all aspects of neuroscience. It was established in 1989 with Ray Guillery (then at the University of Oxford) as the founding editor-in-chief. The editor-in-chief is John J. Foxe (University of Rochester) The journal is published by Wiley-Blackwell on behalf of the Federation of European Neuroscience Societies. Authors can elect to have accepted articles published as open access. The journal adopted transparent peer-review in January 2017.

Features
The journal also publishes special and virtual issues related to topical issue in neuroscience.

Editors-in-chief
The following persons have been or are editor-in-chief:
Ray Guillery (1989–1993)
Michel Cuénod (1993–1997)
Barry Everitt (1997–2002)
Barry Everitt and Chris Henderson (2002–2008)
Jean-Marc Fritschy and Martin Sarter (2008–2014)
J. Paul Bolam and John J. Foxe (2014–2020)
John J. Foxe (2020–present)

Abstracting and indexing
The journal is abstracted and indexed in Elsevier Biobase, Biological Abstracts, BIOSIS Previews, EMBASE/Excerpta Medica, Index Medicus/MEDLINE, PsycINFO, PubMed, Science Citation Index Expanded, Scopus, and The Zoological Record. According to the Journal Citation Reports, the journal has a 2021 impact factor of 3.698.

References

External links

Neuroscience journals
Publications established in 1989
English-language journals
Wiley-Blackwell academic journals
Biweekly journals
Hybrid open access journals
Academic journals associated with international learned and professional societies of Europe